Nandasena is a Sinhalese name that may refer to the following notable people:
Given name
Nandasena Pathirana (born 1942), Sri Lankan cricket umpire
Nandasena Perera (1954–2019), Sri Lankan golfer

Surname
K. H. Nandasena (born 1954), Sri Lankan politician

Sinhalese masculine given names
Sinhalese surnames